Counties 3 Yorkshire, previously known as Yorkshire 3, is an English rugby union league at the ninth tier of the domestic competition. Club rugby in Yorkshire operates without promotion play-offs meaning that the top two teams are automatically promoted to Counties 2 Yorkshire and the bottom two teams are relegated to either Yorkshire 4 (North West) or Yorkshire 4 (South East) depending on location.  Each season a team from Yorkshire 3 or Yorkshire 4 may be picked to take part in the RFU Junior Vase - a national competition for clubs at levels 9-12.

Participating clubs 2022–23

The teams competing in 2022-23.

Participating clubs 2021–22

The teams competing in 2021-22 achieved their places in the league based on performances in 2019-20, the 'previous season' column in the table below refers to that season not 2020-21.

Season 2020–21

On 30 October 2020 the RFU announced  that due to the coronavirus pandemic a decision had been taken to cancel Adult Competitive Leagues (National League 1 and below) for the 2020/21 season meaning Yorkshire 3 was not contested.

Participating clubs 2019–20

Participating clubs 2018-19

Participating clubs 2017-18

Participating clubs 2016-17
Aireborough
Baildon 
Castleford (relegated from Yorkshire 2)
Goole 
Halifax 
Halifax Vandals (promoted from Yorkshire 4)
Harrogate Pythons
Knottingley (relegated from Yorkshire 2)
Leeds Medics and Dentists 		
Leeds Modernians
Northallerton
Old Otliensians	
Stocksbridge
Wensleydale (promoted from Yorkshire 4)

Participating clubs 2015-16
Aireborough
Baildon 
Bramley Phoenix	
Goole (relegated from Yorkshire 2)
Halifax (promoted from Yorkshire 4)
Harrogate Pythons
Leeds Medics and Dentists (relegated from Yorkshire 2)		
Leeds Modernians
Northallerton
Old Otliensians	
Rotherham Phoenix
Stocksbridge
Thornensians
Wetherby (promoted from Yorkshire 4)

Participating clubs 2014-15
Aireborough
Baildon (relegated from Yorkshire 2)
Bramley Phoenix	
Burley	
Castleford
Harrogate Pythons
Hemsworth	
Northallerton	
Old Grovians	
Old Modernians
Old Otliensians (promoted from Yorkshire 4)	
Rotherham Phoenix
Stocksbridge (promoted from Yorkshire 4)
Thornensians

Participating clubs 2013-14
Aireborough 
Bramley Phoenix
Burley
Castleford
Goole
Harrogate Pythons (promoted from Yorkshire 4)
Hemsworth
Leeds Medics and Dentists
Northallerton
Old Grovians (promoted from Yorkshire 4)
Old Modernians
Rotherham Phoenix
Skipton (relegated from Yorkshire 2)
Thornensians

Participating clubs 2012–13
Aireborough
Baildon
Bramley Phoenix
Burley
Goole
Hemsworth
Hessle
Leeds Medics and Dentists
Northallerton
Old Modernians	
Old Rishworthians
Rotherham Phoenix
Thornensians
York Railway Institute

Original teams
When league rugby began in 1987 this division contained the following teams:

Airebronians
Baildon
Bradford Salem
Bridlington
Heath
Knottingley
Leeds CSSA
Marist
Northallerton
Rodillians
Yarnbury

Yorkshire 3 honours

Yorkshire 3 (1987–1993)

The original Yorkshire 3 was a tier 11 league with promotion up to Yorkshire 2 and relegation down to Yorkshire 4.

Yorkshire 3 (1993–2000)

The creation of National 5 North for the 1993–94 season meant that Yorkshire 3 dropped to become a tier 12 league.  A further restructure at the end of the 1995–96 season, which included the cancellation of National 5 North and the addition of North East 3 at tier 9, saw Yorkshire 3 remain at tier 12.

Yorkshire 3 (2000–present)

Northern league restructuring by the RFU at the end of the 1999-2000 season saw the cancellation of North East 1, North East 2 and North East 3 (tiers 7-9).  This meant that Yorkshire 3 became a tier 9 league.

Number of league titles

Aireborough (2)
Heath (2)
Leeds Corinthians (2)
Roundhegians (2)
Wetherby (2)
Wath upon Dearne (2)
Yarnbury (2)
Barnsley (2)
Bradford Salem (1)
Bridlington (1)
Goole (1)
Halifax Vandals (1)
Hemsworth (1)
Huddersfield Y.M.C.A. (1)
Hullensians (1)
Knottingley (1)
Leodiensian (1)
Moortown (1)
Northallerton (1)
Pocklington (1)
Old Grovians (1)
Old Rishworthians (1)
Skipton (1)
Wensleydale (1)
West Park Leeds (1)
York Railway Institute (1)

Notes

See also
Yorkshire RFU
English rugby union system
Rugby union in England

References

9
Rugby union competitions in Yorkshire